Gordon M. Kaufman is Morris A. Adelman Professor of Management, Emeritus Professor of Statistics at the MIT Sloan School of Management, Massachusetts Institute of Technology since 2014. The International Association for Mathematical Geosciences appointed him as the Distinguished Lecturer for 2015.

In 1985 he was elected as a Fellow of the American Statistical Association.

Education
BS in industrial and electrical engineering, Yale University (where he was a business associate of campus humor magazine The Yale Record)
MBA Harvard University
DBA Harvard University

Selected books
Gordon M. Kaufman (2011), Risk Analysis: From Prospect to Exploration Portfolio and Back.  Nabu Press, 66 p.
Gordon M. Kaufman, Patrick J. Lee (1992), Are Wildcat Well Outcomes Dependent Or Independent?, Sloan School of Management, Massachusetts Institute of Technology, 43 p.
Giovanni Andreatta, Gordon M. Kaufman (1990), Software Reliability Modeling and Exponential Order Statistics, Sloan School of Management, Massachusetts Institute of Technology, 45 p.
Eytan Barouch, Gordon M. Kaufman (1976), Oil and Gas Discovery Modelled as Sampling Proportional to Random Size, M.I.T. Alfred P. Sloan School of Management, 63 p.
Eytan Barouch, Gordon M. Kaufman (1976), On Sums of Lognormal Random Variables, Sloan School of Management, Massachusetts Institute of Technology, 42 p.
Gordon M. Kaufman (1963), Statistical decision and related techniques in oil and gas exploration. Ford Foundation Doctoral Dissertation Series, Prentice Hall, 307 p.

References

Living people
Yale University alumni
Harvard Business School alumni
MIT Sloan School of Management faculty
Fellows of the American Statistical Association
Year of birth missing (living people)